Tadukhipa, in the Hurrian language Tadu-Hepa, was a princess of the Mitanni kingdom. The daughter of King Tushratta of Mitanni and his queen Juni, and niece of Artashumara. Tadukhipa's aunt Gilukhipa (sister of Tushratta) had married Pharaoh Amenhotep III in his 10th regnal year. Tadukhipa was to marry Amenhotep III more than two decades later.

Early life
Tadukhipa was the daughter of King Tushratta of Mitanni, who is believed to have reigned c. 1382 BC–1342 BC. She is believed to have been born around Year 21 of the reign of Egyptian Pharaoh Amenhotep III (c. 1366 BC). Almost nothing is known of her early years. In approximately Year 36 of Amenhotep's reign (c. 1352), Tushratta sent her to Egypt to marry the pharaoh, who was a close ally.

Relatively little is known about this princess of Mitanni. She is believed to have been born around Year 21 of the reign of Egyptian Pharaoh Amenhotep III, (c. 1366 BC). Fifteen years later, Tushratta married his daughter to his ally Amenhotep III to cement their two states alliances in Year 36 of Amenhotep III's reign (1352 BC). Tadukhipa is referenced in seven of Tushratta's thirteen Amarna letters, of about 1350-1340 BC. Tushratta requested that his daughter would become a queen consort, even though that position was held by Queen Tiye. In return, Amenhotep III never sent the golden statues he offered and, after his death, Tushratta sent some missives complaining about the lack of reciprocity.

Life in Egypt
King Tushratta sent his daughter to Egypt with many gifts for Pharaoh Amenhotep. These gifts included: a gold-plated chariot inlaid with precious stones, a pair of horses, a litter adorned with gold and precious stones, clothes and garments, a horse saddle adorned with gold eagles, jewelry such as bracelets, armlets, and other ornaments, and a large chest to hold those items. Amenhotep had offered to send golden statutes to Tushratta as part of the marriage agreement. However, no evidence exists that the gifts were sent to Mitanni.

Tushratta had requested that his daughter become Great Royal Wife to Amenhotep. However, the position was already held by Queen Tiye. Amenhotep III died soon after Tadukhipa's arrival in Egypt and his son,  Amenhotep IV, became pharaoh. Tadukhipa's existence in Egypt is attested to through Amarna letters that mention her, including missives Tushratta sent asking after the golden statutes he was promised by Amenhotep III. It is speculated that Tadukhipa eventually remarried Amenhotep IV, however it has not been definitively proven.

Identification with Kiya or Nefertiti
Some scholars tentatively identify Tadukhipa with Kiya, a known wife of Akhenaten. It has been suggested that the story of Kiya may be the source for the New Kingdom story called the "Tale of Two Brothers." This fable tells the story of how the pharaoh fell in love with a beautiful foreign woman after smelling her hair. If Tadukhipa was later known as Kiya, then she would have lived at Amarna where she had her own sunshade and was depicted with the pharaoh and at least one daughter.

Others such as Petrie, Drioton and Vandier have suggested that Tadukhipa was given a new name after becoming the consort of Akhenaten and is to be identified the famous queen Nefertiti. This theory suggests that Nefertiti's name "the beautiful one has come" refers to foreign origin, such as Tadukhipa's Mitanni origin. Seele, Meyer and others have pointed out that Tey, wife of Ay, held the title of nurse to Nefertiti, and that this argues against this identification. A mature princess arriving in Egypt would not need a nurse.

References

Hurrian people
1360s BC births
Queens consort of the Eighteenth Dynasty of Egypt
14th-century BC Egyptian women
Year of death unknown
Wives of Amenhotep III
Wives of Akhenaten
Ancient Mesopotamian women